Uri Gershuni is an Israeli photographer and educator.

Biography 
Uri Gershuni was born in Raanana in 1970. He is son of Israeli painter Moshe Gershuni and sculptor and jewelry designer Bianca Eshel Gershuni.

Gershuni graduated from Bezalel Academy of Arts and Design’s Photography Department, holding BFA and MFA. He teaches at the Bezalel Academy of Arts and Design and in WIZO Haifa Academy of Design and Education. He works and lives in Tel Aviv.

He was a photographer for Yedioth Ahronoth from 2003 and 2007. From 2009 he is a photographer for Haaretz.

Uri Gershuni works are in permanent collections of Tel Aviv Museum of Art, Haifa Museum of Art, Israel Museum, Petach Tikva Museum of Art, Shpilman Institute of Photography.

He is gay.

Exhibitions

Israel

Worldwide

Curatorial projects 
 2010 Sofia, Solo Exhibition of Bianca Eshel Gershuni, Inga gallery, Tel Aviv
 2011 Hatima Tova, Group Exhibition, Inga gallery, Tel Aviv
 2012 Incident Light, solo exhibition of Sasha Flit, Indie Gallery
 2013 Big Yekatherina, solo exhibition of Valery Bikovsky, part of the exhibition Art's Outer Circles, Haifa Museum of Art
 2014 Horror Movie, group exhibition, the International Photography Festival, Rishon LeZion
 2014 Nehushtan, group exhibition, Chelouche Gallery, Tel Aviv

Awards 
 1995 - Special presidential grant for excellence, Bezalel Academy of Art and Design, Jerusalem
 2000 - Minister of education and culture award for young Israeli artist
 2005 - Young photographers award on behalf of Haifa Museum of Art
 2007 - Heskia Hacmun award
 2012 - Israel's Minister of Culture ‘Art Encouragement’ Award

Gallery

References

External links 
 Uri Gershuni
 The Double Exposure Project: Uri Gershuni & Hagi Kenaan

Israeli photographers
Jewish Israeli artists
Gay Jews
Gay photographers
1970 births
Israeli people of Polish-Jewish descent
Living people
Israeli contemporary artists
Israeli gay artists
Israeli LGBT photographers